The Critical Assessment of Genome Interpretation (CAGI) is an annual bioinformatics competition focused on interpretation of genome variation.

References

Bioinformatics